The Deerfield Valley News is a weekly newspaper based in Wilmington in the US state of Vermont. This independent newspaper was established in 1966 and covers the Mount Snow region including the Deerfield Valley towns of Dover, Wilmington, Halifax, Wardsboro, Whitingham, Searsburg, Marlboro, Readsboro, and Jacksonville. Deerfield Valley News is owned by Vermont Media Publishing Co., LTD. The publisher is Randy Capitani and the news editor is Mike Eldred. Deerfield Valley News has a weekly paid circulation of 3,500 copies.

History 
As of 1980, Nancy Leach was the former editor of the Deerfield Valley News.

In 2010, the Deerfield Valley News was mentioned in the Burlington Free Press in an article entitled "Attorney general investigates Halifax Selectboard meeting". In this article about the alleged violation of Vermont's open meeting law by the Halifax Selectboard, it was said that according to the Deerfield Valley News, "former town auditor Mary Brewster filed a complaint about practices by the three-member board".

In 2011, the Wilmington area was among the worst hit by Tropical Storm Irene.  The Deerfield Valley News was able to continue production and published the weekly that contained many images and news of destruction caused by the flooding. Consequently, a photograph taken by Mike Eldred of North Main Street in Wilmington engulfed in flood water was included in the Burlington Free Press.

Awards 
The paper was recognized by the Vermont Press Group at the annual Vermont Press Association awards. In 1998, Deerfield Valley News won third place for the 'Best State Story' written by Sarah Wolfe and third place for 'Feature photo' by Dawn Nieters while in 1999 the paper won second place for 'Best Local Story' by Dawn Nieters. The paper was also recognized in 2002 winning second place again for 'Best Local story' by Mike Eldred. In 2010, the Vermont Basketball Coaches Association presented Christian Avard of the Deerfield Valley News with the local media award.

References 

Newspapers published in Vermont
Publications established in 1966
1966 establishments in Vermont
Wilmington, Vermont
Weekly newspapers published in the United States